The Göta Artillery Regiment, designation A 2, was a Swedish Army artillery regiment that traced its origins back to the 17th century. It was disbanded in 1962. The regiment's soldiers were originally recruited from Götaland, and it was also garrisoned there.

History 

The regiment has its origins in the Artillery Regiment, raised in 1636. That regiment was split into four new regiments in 1794 of which Göta Artillery Regiment was one. The regiment was given the designation A 2 (2nd Artillery Regiment) in 1830. In 1893 four companies were split off to form Norrland Artillery Regiment and Karlsborg Artillery Corps.

The regiment also changed name to 1st Göta Artillery Regiment (Första Göta artilleriregemente) in 1893, and another two companies were split off to form Småland Artillery Regiment in 1895. The name was changed back again in 1904. The regiment was garrisoned in Gothenburg until it was disbanded in 1962.

Campaigns 

?

Organisation 

?

Heraldry and traditions
The regiment was awarded a unit standard by His Majesty the Gustaf V on his birthday on 16 June 1938. During the disbandment of the regiment, Gothenburg Anti-Aircraft Corps took over traditions and the standard. Also part of the name was taken over by the anti-aircraft corps, when it on 1 July 1962 changed its name to Göta Anti-Aircraft Regiment (Göta luftvärnsregemente). The memory of the regiment is carried on by the Artillery Regiment.

Commanding officers
Regimental commanders between 1794 and 1962.

1794–1801: Anders Leonard Treffenberg
1801–1817: Carl Ulric Silfversköld 
1817–1834: Gillis Edenhjelm
1834–1840: Gustaf Adolf Flemming
1840–1849: Peter Carl Heijl
1849–1858: Bror Gustaf Reinhold Munck af Fulkila
1858–1860:  Knut August Schytzerkrans 
1860–1870: Charles Nicolas Berg
1870–1884: Frans Reinhold Carlsohn
1884–1888: Karl Vilhelm Kuylenstjerna 
1888–1898: John Raoul Hamilton
1898–1904: Georg Liljenroth
1904–1913: Axel Bergenzaun
1913–1922: Carl Bastiat Hamilton
1922–1930: Sixten Schmidt
1930-1931: Oscar Osterman
1931–1936: Gunnar Salander
1936–1938: Axel Rappe
1938–1943: Sune Bergelin
1943–1946: Gunnar Ekeroth
1946–1957: Stig Tarras-Wahlberg
1957–1960: Alarik Astrup G:son Bergman
1960–1962: Nils Gustaf Holmstedt

Names, designations and locations

See also
List of Swedish artillery regiments

Footnotes

References

Notes

Print

Further reading

Artillery regiments of the Swedish Army
Military units and formations established in 1794
Military units and formations disestablished in 1962
1794 establishments in Sweden
1962 disestablishments in Sweden
Disbanded units and formations of Sweden
Gothenburg Garrison